Zieria madida is a plant in the citrus family Rutaceae and endemic to tropical north-eastern Queensland. It is an open, compact shrub with three-part leaves and up to ten white to pale pink flowers with four petals and four stamens arranged in the leaf axils. It usually grows in exposed, windswept locations on granite mountaintops.

Description
The leaves are composed of three elliptic to narrow egg-shaped leaflets. Both sides of the leaflets are glabrous. The flowers are white to pale pink and are arranged in groups of between three and ten in leaf axils, although only three are open at the same time. The flowers are surrounded by scale-like bracts which remain during flowering.

Taxonomy and naming
Zieria madida was first formally described in 2007 by Marco Duretto and Paul Forster from a specimen collected on Thornton Peak and the description was published in Austrobaileya. The specific epithet (madida) is a Latin word meaning "moist", "soaked" or "sodden" referring to the wet, misty mountaintops where this species grows.

Distribution and habitat
This zieria is found on and around Thornton Peak and Mount Pieter Botte where it grows on windswept granite outcrops on mountaintops.

References

madida
Sapindales of Australia
Flora of Queensland
Taxa named by Marco Duretto
Plants described in 2007
Taxa named by Paul Irwin Forster